Gunnar Johansson (born 29 February 1924 – 14 February 2003) was a Swedish footballer who played as a centre-back.

He played for the Sweden national football team at the 1950 FIFA World Cup before leaving Sweden for Olympique de Marseille where he played with Gunnar Andersson.

Titles
Marseille
 Coupe de France (runner-up): 1954

References

External links
 
 Profile
 Profile

1924 births
2003 deaths
Association football central defenders
Swedish footballers
Sweden international footballers
GAIS players
Ligue 1 players
Olympique de Marseille players
1950 FIFA World Cup players
Swedish football managers
Halmstads BK managers
Expatriate footballers in France
Pays d'Aix FC players
Pays d'Aix FC managers